Wallal is a rural town in the Shire of Murweh, Queensland, Australia. The town is within the locality of Bakers Bend.

History 
The town of Walla first appears on an 1877 survey plan.

Wallal Provisional School opened in 1900 and closed in 1907.

References

External links 
 Town map of Wallal, 1926

Shire of Murweh
Towns in Queensland
Bakers Bend